Arvo Jaakko Haavisto (7 January 1900 – 22 April 1977) was a Finnish wrestler. He won a bronze medal at the 1924 Olympics and a gold medal in 1928, both in freestyle wrestling.

Haavisto took up wrestling in 1918 and won four Finnish titles: in 1925–1927 in freestyle and in 1925 in Greco-Roman wrestling. After retiring from competitions he worked as a wrestling coach and referee, attending the 1936 Olympics in this capacity. Since 1992 an annual Greco-Roman wrestling tournament has been held in his honor in his native Ilmajoki.

References

External links
 

1900 births
1977 deaths
People from Ilmajoki
People from Vaasa Province (Grand Duchy of Finland)
Olympic wrestlers of Finland
Wrestlers at the 1924 Summer Olympics
Wrestlers at the 1928 Summer Olympics
Finnish male sport wrestlers
Olympic gold medalists for Finland
Olympic bronze medalists for Finland
Olympic medalists in wrestling
Medalists at the 1924 Summer Olympics
Medalists at the 1928 Summer Olympics
Finnish wrestling coaches
Sportspeople from South Ostrobothnia
20th-century Finnish people